Yoakum High School is a public high school located in Yoakum, Texas (USA) and classified as a 3A school by the UIL. It is part of the Yoakum Independent School District located in northeastern DeWitt County.   High school students from the nearby Sweet Home Independent School District and St. Joseph Catholic School have the option to attend Yoakum High School.  In 2015, the school was rated "Met Standard" by the Texas Education Agency.

Athletics
The Yoakum Bulldogs compete in these sports - 

Cross Country, Volleyball, Football, Basketball, Powerlifting, Golf, Tennis, Track, Soccer, Softball and Baseball

State Titles
Boys Cross Country - 
1986(3A), 1996(3A)
Girls Golf - 
1984(3A), 1990(3A), 1991(3A), 1992(3A), 1993(3A), 1995(3A), 1996(3A), 2004(3A)
Girls Track - 
1988(3A)
Boys Track
2018 (3A)

References

External links
 
 Yoakum ISD

Schools in DeWitt County, Texas
Public high schools in Texas